Beatrice Masini (April 1, 1962, in Milan) is an Italian writer, journalist and translator, best known for her Italian translations of the Harry Potter novels. Her own novels have been nominated for the Strega Prize in 2010, and the Premio Campiello in 2013.

References 

1962 births
Living people
Italian writers
Italian translators